Dolores is a municipality in the El Petén department of Guatemala. It contains 26,269 people. The municipality includes the Maya archaeological sites of Ixkun, Ixtutz, Ixtonton and El Chal. The town is home to the Museo Regional del Sureste de Petén.

External links

Municipalities of the Petén Department
Populated places established in 1708
1708 establishments in the Spanish Empire